Elliot James Wilson (born 10 November 1979) is an English cricketer, born in Hertford. He has played three List A games, all in the C&G Trophy: one for Warwickshire Cricket Board in 2002, and two for Lincolnshire in 2003 and 2004. His only wicket at this level was that of Glamorgan's Matthew Maynard in 2004.

External links
 

1979 births
Living people
English cricketers
Lincolnshire cricketers
People from Hertford
Warwickshire Cricket Board cricketers